George Island is an island in the Falkland Islands. This place may also refer to:
 George Island (Lake Winnipeg)
 George Island (Greenland), near Meteorite Island
 Georges Island (Nova Scotia)
 George Dog Island, British Virgin Islands
 George Rocks, Tasmania

See also
King George Island (disambiguation)
St. George Island (disambiguation)